Maksym Maksymenko (born 28 May 1990) is a Ukrainian professional footballer who plays as a centre-back for Greek Super League 2 club AEL.

Career
Maksymenko is a product of FC Shakhtar youth sportive school . He began his professional career in 2007 with FC Shakhtar-3 Donetsk.

Krymteplytsia Molodizhne
In the summer of 2009 he played at Krymteplytsia Molodizhne on loan.

Tiraspol
In 2010 he moved to the Moldovan club FC Tiraspol. As part of the team, he became the owner of the Moldavian Cup and the bronze medalist of the Moldovan National Division. In the summer of 2013 he returned to Ukraine, where he played for FC Stal Alchevsk. After Stal stopped playing in the Ukrainian championship, he moved to Latvia. Took part in the qualifying matches of the Europa League against the clubs FK Budućnost Podgorica (3: 1, 0: 0) and FK Vojvodina (0: 3, 1: 1).

Desna Chernihiv
In 2016, he signed a contract with Desna Chernihiv, the main club in Chernihiv in which he spent a season and a half, winning silver medals in the Ukrainian First League.

Kolos Kovalivka
In July 2017 he moved to FC Kolos Kovalivka in Ukrainian First League. In the season 2018–19 with the team he got promoted to Ukrainian Premier League.

AEL
In January 2021 he moved to AEL Larissa in Super League Greece. He played the first match with the new club in Greek Cup against Paok in the season 2020–21.

Career statistics

Club

Honours
Kolos Kovalivka
 Ukrainian First League: 2018–19

Desna Chernihiv
 Ukrainian First League: 2016–17

FC Tiraspol
 Moldovan Cup: 2012–13

AEL
 Super League Greece 2: Runner-Up 2021–22

References

External links
 
 

1990 births
Living people
Footballers from Kramatorsk
Ukrainian footballers
Ukrainian Premier League players
FC Shakhtar Donetsk players
FC Krymteplytsia Molodizhne players
FC Shakhtar-3 Donetsk players
FC Tiraspol players
FC Stal Alchevsk players
FC Desna Chernihiv players
FC Kolos Kovalivka players
Athlitiki Enosi Larissa F.C. players
Ukrainian expatriate footballers
FK Spartaks Jūrmala players
Expatriate footballers in Moldova
Expatriate footballers in Latvia
Expatriate footballers in Greece
Ukrainian expatriate sportspeople in Moldova
Ukrainian expatriate sportspeople in Latvia
Ukrainian expatriate sportspeople in Greece
Ukraine youth international footballers
Association football defenders
Moldovan Super Liga players
Latvian Higher League players
Ukrainian First League players
Ukrainian Second League players
Super League Greece players
Super League Greece 2 players